Namulauʻulu Papaliʻi Leota Sami Leota (born ca. 1968) is a Samoan politician and former member of the Legislative Assembly of Samoa. He is a member of the Human Rights Protection Party.

Leota is a businessman who has worked for Federal Pacific Insurance and as a board member of the Central Bank of Samoa and Samoa National Provident Fund. He is also a former manager of the Samoa national rugby union team and President of the Samoa Rugby Union. He ran for parliament unsuccessfully at the 2016 election but lost to Paʻu Sefo Paʻu. Following Pa’u's death in 2019 he was elected in a by-election.

He ran in the seat of Faʻasaleleaga No. 3 at the 2021 election, but was unsuccessful. He later withdrew an election petition against the winner.

References

Living people
Members of the Legislative Assembly of Samoa
Human Rights Protection Party politicians
Year of birth missing (living people)